Darko Raca (born May 24, 1977) is a Bosnian-Herzegovinian football defender.

Beside the Bosnian clubs FK Kozara Gradiška, HNK Orašje and FK Sarajevo, he had previously played with the Serbian clubs FK Mladost Apatin and FK ČSK Čelarevo, and the Swedish clubs Vasalunds IF and Syrianska FC.

External links
 Profile at Srbijafudbal
 
 Profile at Playerhistory
 FR Yugoslavia 3rd League teams at 1998-99 in Tripod.com

1977 births
Living people
Footballers from Sarajevo
Association football defenders
Bosnia and Herzegovina footballers
FK Mladost Apatin players
FK Kozara Gradiška players
HNK Orašje players
FK Sarajevo players
Vasalunds IF players
Syrianska FC players
FK Laktaši players
FK ČSK Čelarevo players
FK Sloboda Tuzla players
FK Slavija Sarajevo players
Premier League of Bosnia and Herzegovina players
Division 2 (Swedish football) players
Ettan Fotboll players
Serbian First League players
Bosnia and Herzegovina expatriate footballers
Expatriate footballers in Serbia and Montenegro
Bosnia and Herzegovina expatriate sportspeople in Serbia and Montenegro
Expatriate footballers in Sweden
Bosnia and Herzegovina expatriate sportspeople in Sweden
Expatriate footballers in Serbia
Bosnia and Herzegovina expatriate sportspeople in Serbia